The following table lists the largest ever corporate spin-offs.

See also 
 List of largest companies by revenue
 List of companies by employees
 List of companies by profit and loss
 List of public corporations by market capitalization
 List of largest pharmaceutical mergers and acquisitions
 List of largest mergers and acquisitions

References

 
Corporate spin-offs